The 1981 National League Championship Series was a best-of-five series to end the 1981 National League season. It was the 13th NLCS in all. The series featured the first-half West Division champion Los Angeles Dodgers and the second-half East Division champion Montreal Expos. The Dodgers won the series three games to two over the Expos, thanks to a ninth-inning home run in Game 5 by Rick Monday in what has ever since been referred to as "Blue Monday" by Expos fans.  

The Dodgers would go on to defeat the New York Yankees in the World Series.

Background 
Due to the 1981 Major League Baseball strike, a team had to win two postseason series in order to go to the World Series. Teams that finished first in their division in the first and second halves of the season advanced to the postseason. This was the first year the baseball postseason had three rounds, an arrangement that would permanently return beginning with the 1995 season. The Expos advanced to the NLCS after defeating the defending World Series champion Philadelphia Phillies in the NL Division Series three games to two, and the Dodgers made their way to the NLCS after beating the Houston Astros three games to two in the NLDS.

Summary

Montreal Expos vs. Los Angeles Dodgers

Game summaries

Game 1 

The Dodgers took the first game of the series behind the strong pitching of starter Burt Hooton. For the first seven innings the game stayed close, with the only scoring coming in the second inning when the Dodgers got two runs on an RBI double by Ron Cey and a squeeze bunt by Bill Russell. Hooton and reliever Bob Welch made the 2–0 lead stand up until the eighth when the Dodgers broke the game open with three more runs on back-to-back homers by Pedro Guerrero and Mike Scioscia. The Expos got one run back in the ninth when Larry Parrish doubled home Gary Carter. But reliever Steve Howe came on for the Dodgers and got the final three outs to preserve Los Angeles' victory.

Game 2 

Montreal's Ray Burris helped even the series with a masterful complete game shutout in Game 2. The Dodgers managed only five singles against Burris, and their only real threats, in the sixth and ninth, were foiled by double plays. Typically in what would be a very low-scoring series, the Expos didn't do much more hitting against Dodger starter Fernando Valenzuela. But Montreal did manage to push across two runs in the second on RBI hits by Warren Cromartie and Tim Raines. Montreal added another run in the sixth, aided by Dusty Baker's error in left. Burris did the rest to notch his 3–0 victory.

Game 3 

Montreal got another superb pitching performance in Game 3, this time from Steve Rogers, to take a 2–1 lead in the series. Rogers allowed only a single run on a Ron Cey groundout after singles by Dusty Baker and Steve Garvey in the fourth. For a while it looked like Dodger starter Jerry Reuss might make that 1–0 score hold up. But Montreal finally rallied for four runs in the sixth on a run-scoring single by Larry Parrish and a three-run homer by Jerry White. Rogers easily preserved the 4–1 lead over the final three innings, and Montreal was now only one victory away from the World Series.

Game 4 

For the first seven innings Game 4 followed the usual pattern of the series, with dominant performances from both starting pitchers. Montreal's Bill Gullickson allowed an unearned run in the third, after Bill Russell reached on Larry Parrish's error and scored on Dusty Baker's double. Los Angeles' Burt Hooton gave up the game-tying run in the fourth on another unearned tally, when Gary Carter reached on Ron Cey's error and scored on a single by Warren Cromartie. The starters yielded nothing more until the eighth, when Steve Garvey's two-run homer put the Dodgers up 3–1 and chased Gullickson. The Dodgers blew the game open with four more runs in the ninth, highlighted by Baker's two-run single. Hooton finally tired in the eighth but the Dodger bullpen got the last five outs and the series was even.

Game 5 

After a rainout (actually a snow/cold out) on Sunday, October 18, Olympic Stadium was only two-thirds full for Game 5 on a cold and drizzly Monday afternoon, which turned out to be the series' most dramatic contest. As usual in the series, the starting pitchers dominated, with the Dodgers' Fernando Valenzuela and the Expos' Ray Burris. Montreal broke on top with a single run in the first when Tim Raines led off with a double and eventually scored on a double play. The Dodgers tied the game in the fifth after Rick Monday singled, went to third on a Pedro Guerrero single, and scored on a groundout. Burris finally left the game in the eighth when the Expos pinch-hit for him. Montreal brought on their ace Steve Rogers to pitch the ninth, and with two out in the inning, he gave up a homer to Monday on a 3–1 count to put the Dodgers up 2–1. The Expos got a couple of two-out walks in the bottom of the ninth off Valenzuela, but Bob Welch came on to get the final out and send the Dodgers to the World Series. It would be the final postseason game played in Montreal and it would take another 31 seasons until the franchise returned to the postseason again as the Washington Nationals.

The date came to be known as "Blue Monday" by Expos' fans. Expos' broadcaster Dave Van Horne described the loss as one of the lowest points in team history.

Composite box
1981 NLCS (3–2): Los Angeles Dodgers over Montreal Expos

Aftermath
The Dodgers went on to defeat the New York Yankees four games to two in the 1981 World Series, their only championship in the Garvey-Lopes-Russell-Cey era. From 1973-81, the historic infield combined for 21 All-Star selections, with each man receiving at least three.

According to “The Colorful Montreal Expos” episode of MLB Network Presents, Monday himself was left unaware of “Blue Monday” until he tried eating at a restaurant in Montreal with Steve Yeager during the Dodgers’ first road series in 1982 against the Expos and were asked by the manager to leave since six of the patrons were wanting to instigate a fight with him, with Monday commenting that “The winters are long in Montreal and they don’t forget anything” in response. Los Angeles went on to win the 1981 World Series, defeating the New York Yankees 4 games to 2.

This was the only postseason appearance for the Montreal Expos before the franchise moved to Washington, D.C. and became the Washington Nationals. In Blue Monday: The Expos, the Dodgers, and the Home Run That Changed Everything, author Danny Gallagher argues that Rick Monday's home run in the 9th inning of game five, which eliminated the Expos from advancing to the World Series, was the moment that preceded the Expos exit in Montreal.

References

External links
Baseball-Reference.com – 1981 NLCS

National League Championship Series
Montreal Expos postseason
Los Angeles Dodgers postseason
National League Championship Series
National League Championship Series
History of Canada (1960–1981)
1981 in sports in California
National League Championship Series
1980s in Montreal
1981 in Quebec
National League Championship Series
National League Championship Series